4-Ethylguaiacol, often abbreviated to 4-EG, is a phenolic compound with the molecular formula C9H12O2. It can be produced in wine and beer by Brettanomyces. It is also frequently present in bio-oil produced by pyrolysis of lignocellulosic biomass.

Winemaking 
It is produced along with 4-ethylphenol (4-EP) in wine and beer by the spoilage yeast Brettanomyces. When it is produced by the yeast to concentrations greater than the sensory threshold of  >600 μg/L, it can contribute bacon, spice, clove, or smoky aromas to the wine. On their own these characters can be quite attractive in a wine, however as the compound usually occurs with 4-EP whose aromas can be more aggressive, the presence of the compound often signifies a wine fault. The ratio in which 4-EP and 4-EG are present can greatly affect the organoleptic properties of the wine.

Bio-oil 
4-Ethylguaiacol can also be produced by pyrolysis of lignocellulosic biomass. It is produced from the lignin, along with many of the other phenolic compounds present in bio-oil. In particular, 4-ethylguaiacol is derived from guaiacyl in the lignin.

See also 
 Yeast in winemaking
 Wine chemistry

References 

Natural phenols
Alkylphenols
Phenol ethers